Vasi-ye Olya (also Romanized as Vaşī-ye ‘Olyā; also known as Vaşī-ye Bālā) is a village in Zhavarud-e Sharqi Rural District, in the Central District of Sanandaj County, Kurdistan Province, Iran. At the 2006 census, its population was 274, in 54 families. The village is populated by Kurds.

References 

Towns and villages in Sanandaj County
Kurdish settlements in Kurdistan Province